Renzo Piano  (born 14 September 1937) is an Italian architect. His notable buildings include the Centre Georges Pompidou in Paris (with Richard Rogers, 1977), The Shard in London (2012), the Whitney Museum of American Art in New York City (2015), İstanbul Modern in Istanbul (2022) and Stavros Niarchos Foundation Cultural Center in Athens (2016). He won the Pritzker Architecture Prize in 1998.

Piano has been a Senator for Life in the Italian Senate since 2013.

Early life and first buildings
Piano was born and raised in Genoa, Italy, into a family of builders. His grandfather had created a masonry enterprise, which had been expanded by his father, Carlo Piano, and his father's three brothers, into the firm Fratelli Piano. The firm prospered after World War II, constructing houses and factories and selling construction materials. When his father retired, the enterprise was led by Renzo's older brother, Ermanno, who studied engineering at the University of Genoa. Renzo studied architecture at the University of Florence and Polytechnic University of Milan. He graduated in 1964 with a dissertation about modular coordination (coordinazione modulare) supervised by Giuseppe Ciribini and began working with experimental lightweight structures and basic shelters.

Piano taught at the Polytechnic University from 1965 until 1968, and expanded his horizons and technical skills by working in two large international firms, for the modernist architect Louis Kahn in Philadelphia and for the Polish engineer Zygmunt Stanisław Makowski in London. He completed his first building, the IPE factory in Genoa, in 1968, with a roof of steel and reinforced polyester, and created a continuous membrane for the covering of a pavilion at the Milan Triennale in the same year. In 1970, he received his first international commission, for the Pavilion of Italian Industry for Expo 70 in Osaka, Japan. He collaborated with his brother Ermanno and the family firm, which manufactured the structure. It was lightweight and original composed of steel and reinforced polyester, and it appeared to be simultaneously artistic and industrial.

The 1970 Osaka structure was greatly admired by the British architect Richard Rogers, and in 1971 the two men decided to open their own firm, Piano and Rogers, where they worked together from 1971 to 1977. The first project of the firm was the administrative building of B&B Italia, an Italian furniture company, in Novedrate, Como, Italy. This design featured suspended container and an open bearing structure, with the conduits for heating and water on the exterior painted in bright colors (blue, red and yellow). These unusual features attracted considerable attention in the architectural world, and influenced the choice of the jurors who selected Piano and Rogers to design the Pompidou Center.

The Centre Pompidou and early projects 1973–1977

Centre Pompidou (1973–1977)
In 1971 the thirty-four-year old Piano and Richard Rogers, thirty-eight, in collaboration with the Italian architect Gianfranco Franchini, competed with the major architectural firms in the United States and Europe, and were awarded the commission for the most prestigious project in Paris, the Centre Georges Pompidou, the new French national museum of 20th century art to be located in Beaubourg. The award came a surprise, to the architectural world, since the two were little-known, and had no experience with museums or other major structures. The New York Times declared that their design "turned the architecture world upside down". More literally it turned architecture inside-out, since in the new museum, the apparent structural frame of the building and the heating and air conditioning ducts were on the exterior, painted in bright colors. The escalator, in a transparent tube, crossed the facade of the building at a diagonal. The building was an astonishing success, entirely transforming the character of a run-down commercial section near the Marais in Paris, and made Piano one of the best-known architects in the world.

The media dubbed the style of the building as "high-tech", but this was later disputed by Piano. "Beaubourg," he said, "was a joyous urban machine, a creature which might have come out of a Jules Verne novel, a sort of bizarre boat in dry dock... It is a double provocation; a challenge to academism, but also a parody of the imagery of technology of our time. To consider it as a high-tech object is a mistake."

Menil Collection (1981–1987)
In 1977 Piano ended his collaboration with Rogers and began a new collaboration with engineer Peter Rice, who had assisted in the design of the Pompidou Center. They established their offices in Genoa. One of their first projects was a plan for the rehabilitation of the old port of Otranto from an industrial site into a commercial and tourist attraction (1977). Their first major building was the Menil Collection, in art museum for the art collector Dominique de Menil. The chief requirements of the owner for this building was to make the maximum use of natural light in the interiors. Piano wrote, "Paradoxically, the Menil Collection, with its serenity, its calm, its discretion, is much more modern, scientifically speaking, than the Beaubourg." The Menil Collection building, with its simple gray and white cubic forms, is the stylistic opposite of the Pompidou Center. The technological innovations were not expressed on the facade, but in the high-tech but discreet systems of shutters and screens and air conditioning which allowed maximum illumination while protecting against the intense Texas heat and sunlight.

Old Port of Genoa (1985–2001) and Lingotto Factory in Turin (1983–2003) 
In the mid-1980s Piano and his firm took on a wide variety of projects, using the most advanced technology available, but, in contrast to the Pompidou Center, as discreetly as possible. His portable pavilion for IBM (1983–1986) was an example; designed with Peter Rice, it a lightweight portable tunnel for expositions. It composed of a series of pyramids of polycarbonate supported by a wooden frame, and could be transported in a truck. It was designed to integrate the scenery outside into displays in the interior. He designed a two major reconstruction projects in northern Italy; the reanimation of the old port of his native city, Genoa, and the conversion and modernization of the gigantic and historic Fiat factory in Turin, Italy. For the Fiat Lingotto factory, he preserved the enormous main structure, including its famous oval test track for automobiles on the roof, but added new structures, including a concert hall beneath the building, a heliport, and a glass domed conference center on the roof. He continued his modifications and additions over two decades; without destroying the historic core of the building. The most recent was a museum for the art collection of the Fiat head Giovanni Agnelli in an elegant glass and steel box perched on the roof, as if it were about to take off; it was nicknamed the "Flying bank vault".

Piano also carried out a large program for revitalization of the old port of Genoa to transform it from a rundown industrial area into a cultural center and tourist attraction. He prolonged streets to give access to the port, transformed old port buildings into cultural and commercial buildings, added a library, an aquarium and an auditorium, a botanical garden in glass dome and a giant multi-armed crane, modeled after the old cranes of the port, which hoists visitors high in the air for a view of the port.

In addition, he designed the new headquarters of his firm, the Renzo Piano Building Workshop (1989–1991), on a series of stepped terraces hanging over the Mediterranean to the west of the city. The building is accessed by an eight-passenger funicular railway car which shuttles up and down the hillside.

Paris "The Whale" Commercial Mall Bercy 2 (1990)
"The Whale" Bercy 2 is a shopping mall with 70 stores and 36,000 m2 located in Paris Charenton, along the bankside of the river Seine and the "Périphérique" ring road.

Inaugurated on 24 April 1990, the building is only the third work of architect after the Centre Pompidou. The cyclopean wooden structure, covered with 27,000 satin stainless steel tiles and pierced with oculus to let an overhead light pass, is completely innovative. Its curvature which follows the turn of a ramp on the ring road evokes a large airship, hence the nicknames "The Zeppelin" or "The Whale".

Projects completed 1991–2000

Crown Class Cruise Ships (1989–1991)
In the mid-1980s Sitmar Cruises began a rigorous building schedule for the North American market. At the time one ship the Sitmar Fairmajesty was ordered for French shipyard Chantiers de l'Antlantique. The Italian government through Fincantieri would desire for the next Sitmar ships to be built in Italy. Piano was commissioned to design the ships. Piano designed the exterior of the ships to resemble a dolphin. The Crown Princess was delivered to Princess Cruises in 1990 and the Regal Princess followed a year later in 1991.

Kansai International Airport (1991–1994)
In 1988 Piano and Rice won an international competition for a new airport to be constructed on an artificial island in the port of Osaka, Japan. The main terminal he designed was extremely long, with a very low profile, so that the controllers in the control tower could always see the aircraft on the runways. The frequent earthquakes in the Japanese islands required special building techniques; the structure is mounted on hydraulic joints which adjust to movements of the earth.

Fondation Beyeler (1991–1997)
The Fondation Beyeler is a private art museum in Riehen, near Basel, Switzerland, built for the art collection of Ernst Beyeler. Although it opened in the same year as the Guggenheim Bilbao of Frank Gehry, in spirit it was exactly the opposite. It was designed, at the request of the founder, to inspire tranquility, with white walls, light-colored wooden floors, and natural light. The wall separating the museum from the neighboring road constructed of porphyry stone from Patagonia. also used in different parts of the Museum.

Jean-Marie Tjibaou Cultural Centre, Noumea, New Caledonia (1991–1998)
The Jean-Marie Tjibaou Cultural Centre in Nouméa, New Caledonia (1991–1998), is among the most unusual of Piano's works. A joint project between New Caledonia and the French government, it is designed to display the culture of the Kanak people. The project uses a combination of traditional and modern material; local wood, along with glass and aluminum. The complex is located on a narrow peninsula in a lagoon with prevailing winds. The curving wooden pavilions, inspired in form by the local architecture, have a double wooden skin to protect against the weather, but also let in the sunlight. While it is devoted to the local culture, some of the buildings, particularly the towering reception center, with curving walls and wooden spires, are strikingly post-modern in form.

His other projects begun in the 1990s included the New Metropolis Museum in Amsterdam, which later became the science museum and technology NEMO (1992–1997), placed on the edge of the harbor, and resembling the hull of an enormous ship; the Parco della Musica, a complex of music performance halls in Rome (1994–2002), Each was entirely different from the others, and in this period it was difficult to discern a specific element that or style defined his architecture, other than careful craftsmanship and attention to detail.

Potsdamer Platz, Berlin (1992–2000)
Potsdamer Platz is a historic triangle in the heart of Berlin Germany, which had been largely destroyed during World War II, and then divided by the Berlin Wall between East and West Berlin. When a major reconstruction was commenced in 1990, Piano was selected to design the new buildings on five of the fifteen sites of the project, with the requirement that the buildings have roofs of copper, and facades of clear glass and materials of a baked earth color. Other architects engaged in the enormous project included Rafael Moneo, Arata Isozaki, and his former partner, Richard Rogers. The centerpiece of Piano's part of the project was the Debis building, composed of four different buildings of different sizes but in the same style. The complex also included an IMAX movie theater, restaurant and shops. The  dome of the IMAX theater was visible from a distance and also from the street, through the clear glass of the facade. Piano wrote in The Disobedience of the Architect (2004) that he tried to match his architecture to the personality of a city. "The Berliners are accustomed to living outdoors, and to a certain form of conviviality." The new Potsdamer Platz was designed to capture the Berliner's "sense of gaiety, their sense of humor....Why should a city be demoralizing? The beautiful thing about a city is that it is a place of meetings and surprises."

Aurora Place, Sydney, Australia (1996–2000)
Aurora Place in Sydney, Australia (1996–2009) is composed of two towers, an eighteen-story residential building next to a forty-one story office building with different facades but similar metal and glass sunscreens on the roofs. The lower tower was an early example of the luxury high-rise residential buildings by star architects in the center large cities which became very popular in the early 21st century. The office tower has a discreetly peculiar form; the east façade bulges out slightly from its base, reaching its maximum width at the top floors. The curved and twisted shape of east the façade echoes that of the Sydney Opera House on the harbor. The exterior glass curtain-wall extends beyond the main frame, creating an illusion that the wall is independent of the building. of its Glass shutters on the exterior can be opened for ventilation, and Piano designed an exterior skin combining glass and ceramics to regulate the intensity of the sunlight. The office building has interior winter gardens on each floor, and earth-colored ceramic tiles give a dash of color to the facade.

Projects completed 2001–2009

Auditorium Niccolo Paganini (1997–2001)
The Auditorium Niccolo Paganini is a concert hall constructed inside a former sugar mill in the historic center of the city of Parma, Italy. The theater has 780 seats placed on a slope for maximum visibility of the stage. Piano retained the original exterior walls of the main building, but removed the transversal interior walls and replaced them with glass walls, so the entire interior is visible from the outside, and those inside can see the park outside the theater.

Maison Hermès (1998–2001)
The Maison Hermès in the Ginza commercial district of Tokyo is the flagship store in Japan of the French luxury brand. The building is ten stories high, with three floors underground, and includes space for expositions and for a small museum on the history of the firm. The panels of glass were made in Florence, Italy, and placed in supports made in Switzerland, for assembly in Japan. Each piece of the facade is designed to be able to move  to resist earthquakes. When illuminated a night, the building is intended to resemble a "magic lantern".

Auditorium of the Parco della Musica (1994–2002)
The Parco della Musica is the complex of music venues located in the Rome neighborhood which hosted the 1960 Summer Olympics. The park has three theaters, the largest with 2800 seats; when completed it was the largest symphonic concert hall in Europe. Piano acknowledged that his inspiration for the interior plan was the vineyard style seating, placed around the orchestra, of the Berlin Philharmonic by Hans Sharon.   The three brick concert halls covered with what New York Times critic Sam Lubell described as  "weathered armadillo-like steel shells,"  which looked forbidding in photographs but in person were "lovely"; and noted that the theaters "inside are heavy with wood, fabrics, and typical Piano elegance."  He called the whole complex "deceptively simple but smart.".

Nasher Sculpture Center (1999–2003)
In the first decade of the 21st century, a wave of new art museums or museum wings were built to house the collections of wealthy art patrons. Piano, who had been building art museums since 1977, was one of the most active and creative designers of these new buildings; though the requirements and the collections were often similar, he usually succeeded in giving each museum a distinct look and personality. The Nasher Sculpture Center in Dallas, Texas, was funded with 60 million dollars by Raymond Nasher, who had made a fortune in developing shopping centers, to display his collection of modern sculpture, which includes works by Auguste Rodin, Joan Miró, Henri Matisse and Alberto Giacometti.

Zentrum Paul Klee (1999–2005)
The Zentrum Paul Klee near Bern, Switzerland (1999–2005), continued his series of art museums each very different from the others. It was designed in large part to protect the fragile drawings of Paul Klee from sunlight. It housed in a series galleries resembling rolling hills in the Swiss countryside. Piano explained that the shape of the galleries was inspired by naval architecture and the hulls of ships, which were adapted to the form of waves as his building was adapted to the landscape.

High Museum of Art Extension (1999–2005)
The original building of the High Museum of Art in Atlanta, Georgia, designed by Richard Meier, and inspired by the form of the Guggenheim Museum in New York City of Frank Lloyd Wright, opened in 1983. Piano's project added four new structures; a pavilion for exhibitions, a gallery for special collections, a building for offices, and a residence hall for the Atlanta College Of Art, creating  of additional space. Both the new building and the original building are a gleaming white. A glass bridge with two levels connects the main pavilion with the original part of the museum. The careful management of external light is a particular feature of Piano's buildings; the High Museum Extension rows of curving fan-shaped panels on the facade and on the interior ceiling with filter the sunlight. From the parvis on the outside, the white facade gives the impression that the building has no weight at all.

Morgan Library Renovation and Extension (2000–2006)
The extension of the Morgan Library in New York City is next to the original library, a monument of Beaux-Arts architecture designed by McKim, Meade and White (1903), which had been expanded several times. Piano extensively renovated the existing structures and a built a new building the same height as the historic building, with a simple rectangular facade that complemented it. He also added a  cube as a small exhibit space, an underground auditorium with 199 seats, and a glass-walled atrium which united all the parts, old and new. The architecture critic of the  New York Times, Nicolai Ouroussoff, wrote, "the result is a space with the weight of history and the lightness of clouds...a sublime expression of the architect's preoccupation with light."

New York Times Building (2000–2007)
Piano's design for the New York Times Building was chosen after competition whose entrants included projects by Norman Foster, Frank Gehry and Cesar Pelli. The competition rules asked for a building that be as open and transparent as possible, to symbolize the connection between the newspaper and the city. The first six floors are occupied by an atrium with restaurants, shops and a conference center. The distinctive Piano feature of the tower is the clear glass curtain wall outside the facade, and rising higher than the facade itself. The curtain is composed of clear glass and a frame of ceramic tubes suspended  from the facade; it serves as a sunscreen, eliminating the need for tinted or sintered glass.

California Academy of Sciences renovation and extension, San Francisco (2000–2008)
In 1989, after their old museum buildings were damaged by an earthquake, the trustees of the California Academy of Sciences decided to rebuild their entire complex of twelve buildings, including an aquarium, planetarium, and a museum of Natural History, located in Golden Gate Park in San Francisco. Piano's plan called for "a group of volumes under a single roof, a little like a village." The roof itself, 1.5 hectares in area, was covered with vegetation, and blends with the surrounding park. The facade of the building also harmonizes smoothly with the nearby turn-of-the-century greenhouse that is a landmark of the Park. Three cupolas are placed under the high roof, ceiling, lit by natural light through round portholes on their roofs; they contain the entry hall, a botanical garden, and a planetarium. Piano's design for the new building was described by the New York Times as a  "comforting reminder of the civilizing function of great art in a barbaric age".

Modern wing of the Art Institute of Chicago (2000–2009)
In 2000 the City of Chicago launched a major program of cultural buildings in Millennium Park with a new concert hall by Frank Gehry and a new wing of the beaux-arts building Art Institute of Chicago. With its construction of glass, steel and white stone, the new wing is carefully harmonized with the old structure, and, like his other art museums, makes maximum use of natural light. A horizontal sunscreen on the roof, nicknamed the "flying carpet", is a graceful update of his rooftop art museum on the Lingotto factory in Turin.   He also designed a minimalist   steel bridge connecting the sculpture terrace of the museum to Millennium Park. Nikolai Ouroussof, critic of the New York Times, noted that some aspects of the building recalled the work of Ludwig Mies van der Rohe, who had made much of his career in Chicago. "The taut forms and refined details, the elevation of an industrial aesthetic to an art form all are hallmarks of Mies's work." But he noted particularly Piano's masterful control of light within the building:  "...it is the light that most people will notice.... The glass roof of the top-floor galleries is supported on delicate steel trusses. Rows of white blades rest on top of the trusses to filter out strong southern light; thin fabric panels soften the view from below... On a clear afternoon you can catch faint glimpses through the structural frame of clouds drifting by overhead. But most of the time the art takes center stage, everything else fading quietly into the background It is this obsessive refinement that raises Mr. Piano's best architecture to the level of art."

Projects completed 2010 to present

The Shard, London (2000–2010)
Inside, it contains luxury residences and a hotel, along with offices, shops, restaurants, and cultural centers. It has a wide base and a split pinnacle point which seems to disappear into the clouds, like, as Piano described it, "a bell tower of the 16th century, or the mast of great ship...Often buildings of great height are aggressive and arrogant symbols of power and egoism," but the Shard is designed "to express its sharp and light presence in the urban panorama of London." Like his other tall buildings, the glass sunscreen on the exterior extends slightly above the building itself, appearing to split apart at the top. The critical reaction to the tower was predictably mixed. Simon Jenkins of the Guardian of London saw it as a foreign attack on the traditional London skyline and monuments: "This tower is anarchy. It conforms to no planning policy. It marks no architectural focus or rond-point. It offers no civic forum or function, just luxury flats and hotels. It stands apart from the City cluster and pays no heed to its surrounding context in scale, materials or ground presence. It seems to have lost its way from Dubai to Canary Wharf... The Shard has slashed the face of London for ever." However, Jonathan Glancy in the London Telegraph defended Piano's building: "The criticism – hurled against Piano like the spears of Ancient Britons fighting the civilised Romans – is, I think, a bottled up attack on our low standards of design and the beetle-browed politics that have allowed so many poor tall buildings to have been rushed up around St Paul's. The Shard, whatever its flaws – and all its many floors – is a much better building than most of the flakes below it."

Central Saint Giles, London (2002–2010)
The site was previously occupied by a Ministry of Defence building and is partially on the site of a medieval leper colony, St Giles Hospital. A block 109 flats rises 11 floors and is set alongside offices rising to 11 floors to the east. A distinctive element is strident solid color which is designed not to mellow with time; the buildings are covered with large kiln-fired ceramic panels glazed leaf green, orange, lime green, pale grey and yellow. "Cities should not be dull and repetitive", Piano declared. "One of the reason we find them so beautiful and interesting is that they are full of surprises; even the idea of color represents a joyful surprise."

Los Angeles County Museum of Art (BCAM and Resnick Pavilion), Los Angeles (2003–2010)
The BCAM facade is concrete covered with plaques of cream-colored Italian travertine, harmonizing with the older buildings of the museum complex, but added distinctive Piano touches; finlike white sun shutters on the roof softening the sunlight, a red escalator on the outside of the main facade, and a stairway suspended by red cables on the other facade, reminiscent of the Centre Pompidou. The Resnik Pavilion, to the north of the BCAM, has  of space, with travertine covered walls to the east and west, glass walls on the north and south, and a roof with vertical glass shutters that open to the sky. Describing this project, Piano wrote:  "It's not enough that the light is perfect. You also have a need for calm, serenity, and even a quality of voluptuousness connected with the contemplation of a work of art." Nicolai Ouroussoff, the architecture critic of The New York Times, admired the interior of the BCAM but was less impressed by the exteriors: "There is little of the formal freedom that is at the heart of the city's architectural legacy; nor is there much evidence of the structural refinement that we have come to expect in Mr. Piano's best work. The museum's monumental travertine form and lipstick-red exterior stairways are a curious mix of pomposity and pop-culture references. It's an architecture without conviction."

Astrup Fearnley Museum of Modern Art, Oslo, Norway (2006–2012)
The Astrup Fearnley Museum of Modern Art in Oslo, Norway (2006–2012) was designed to revive an old port and industrial area southwest of the center of Oslo with an art museum and offices, and to provide a destination and attraction on the edge of the picturesque fjord. The construction materials include both steel and wood beams. A canal and walkway connect the museum with another area under development nearby, while the museum and walkway offer views of the fjord and center of Oslo. A sculpture park with works of Anish Kapoor, Louise Bourgeois and other notable sculptors is placed between the museum and the water. The museum building on one side of the canal holds permanent exhibits, while the building on the other side is used for temporary exhibits. A bridge over the canal the two museum buildings. The construction materials include steel, glass and wooden beams, while the facades that are not made of glass are covered with finely-crafted weathered panels, in the tradition of Scandinavian architecture.

Kimbell Art Museum extension, Fort Worth, Texas (2007–2013)
The extension of the Kimbell Art Museum in Fort Worth, Texas (2007–2013) is an addition to the museum designed by Louis Kahn the modernist architect for whom Piano worked at the beginning of his career, completed in 1972. The building faces the Modern Art Museum of Fort Worth, designed by Tadao Ando (2002). Piano created a dramatic new entrance for the museum, with huge windows showing the bright red furniture against the alabaster white walls within. The materials used in the new museum included light-colored concrete, to harmonize with the Kahn building, combined with beams and ceilings of Douglas fir, and floors of white oak and an abundance of double-paned and fritted glass. The museum also includes modern ecological features including a vegetal roof, photovoltaic cells on the roof, geothermal wells, and LED lighting. Piano wrote: "Our building echoes the Kahn building through its height, its scale and its general plan, but our building has a character that is more transparent and more open. Light, discreet (half of the surfaces are underground), it nonetheless has its own character and creates a dialogue between the old and the new." However, the museum also attracted critics, who said it was not ambitious enough. Mark Lamster, architecture critic of the Dallas Morning News, wrote: "With its almost impossibly smooth walls and squared columns of titanium-treated concrete, Piano's front facade evinces a clinical, stoic perfectionism.... Altogether, the assembly is a minor miracle of construction. Most impressive are the beams: 100-foot-long bars of laminated Douglas fir, trucked from Canada. But for all its technical mastery, it offers none of the elemental majesty of Kahn's building across the lawn. It is deferential to a fault."

Whitney Museum of American Art, New York City (2007–2015)
The Whitney Museum of American Art decided to move from its original building on Madison Avenue, constructed by Marcel Breuer in 1966, to a new location at the corner of Gansevoort and Washington in Manhatttan, a neighborhood once occupied by meat packing houses, next to the High Line, a riverside highway and park. The museum, with nine levels, has an asymmetric industrial look to match the architecture of the neighborhood. In addition to its interior galleries, it has  of open-air exhibit space on a large terrace atop one section of the building. It was built of steel, concrete, and stone, but also with pine wood and other materials recycled from demolished factories. Jule Iovine, architecture critic of the Wall Street Journal, called it "a welcoming, creative machine" thanks to its "open, changeable spaces,"  and Michael Kimmelman, critic of the New York Times, called it "an outdoor perch to see and be seen... There's a generosity to the architecture, a sense of art connecting with the city and vice versa".

The Harvard Art Museums, Cambridge, Massachusetts (2008–2014)
Beginning in 2008, Piano rebuilt an existing structure to house the Harvard Art Museums, a consolidation of collections of the three art museums associated with Harvard University. The new museum preserved the picturesque brick Ivy-League facade of the 1925 Fogg Museum (1925), but added a new space in the courtyard, covered by a pyramidal glass roof, which increased the gallery space by 40 percent. The renovation adds six levels of galleries, classrooms, lecture halls, and new study areas providing access to parts of the 250,000-piece collection of the museums. The new building was opened in November 2014.

Valletta City Gate and Parliament House, Malta (2011–2015)
The 'City Gate' project in Valletta, Malta was the complete reorganization of the principal entrance to the Maltese capital of Valletta. It included a massive City Gate through the 16th-century city walls, an open-air theatre ‘machine’ within the ruins of the former Royal Opera House, and the construction of a new Parliament building. The gate project was controversial, though the old gate it replaced was only built in the 1960s, in the Italian rationalist style. The "theater machine" is particularly unusual; the original idea was that in summertime a steel portable theater with stage and wings and a thousand seats can be installed inside the ruins of the 19th century opera house, which had been destroyed in World War II. It has its own stage equipment and technology for reproducing the acoustics of a traditional opera house. When performances are not taking place, the "machine" was meant to turn back into a public square and gathering place. The Parliament House (2011–2015) is a mixture of modern technique and technology with the massive stone look of the city's old walls.

Centro de Arte Botín, Santander, Spain (2012–2017)
The Centro Botín in Santander, Spain is a private sponsored project by the Fundación Botín whose aim is to be a hub for the promotion of culture both as a museum and as study centre. It consists on two buildings standing on columns over the sea line at the Bay of Santander. Both are connected by a suspended square and set of stairs and platforms named "pachinko". This was Piano's first project in Spain and had some controversy over its location. Critics describe the building as sublime and striking due to the conjunction of light, views and design that the buildings propose.

Stavros Niarchos Foundation Cultural Center, Athens, Greece (2016)
The Stavros Niarchos Foundation Cultural Center (SNFCC) in Athens, Greece is one of Piano's most dramatic projects. An artificial hill was created to raise the building and give it a view of the nearby sea. The opera house has a 1400-seat main theater and a smaller "black box" theater of 400 seats. On top of the opera house a square horizontal glass box is placed, called Pharos (Lighthouse), similar to the perch of the art museum atop the Lingotto factory in Turin. The cost of the project was 588 million dollars.

Krause Gateway Center, Des Moines, Iowa (2019)
The Krause Gateway Center in downtown Des Moines, Iowa adjacent to Western Gateway Park is the headquarters for the Krause Group, parent company of Kum & Go. The architecture features long overhangs and giant glass panels.

Academy Museum of Motion Pictures, Los Angeles, California (2021)
Academy Museum of Motion Pictures in Los Angeles is a conversion of the former May Company Department Store (1939), an Art Deco landmark opened in 2021.

Projects under construction or in development
 Jerome L. Greene Science Center for Mind Brain Behavior. part of the new Manhattanville Campus of Columbia University in Harlem, New York City, (with SOM). Besides the Greene science center, the RPBW is building the Lenfest Center for the Arts, the Forum, and the School of International and Public Affairs.
 Sesto San Giovanni masterplan, Milan, Italy (2004–)
 One Sydney Harbour tower in Sydney
 565 Broome at 565 Broome St., a twin-tower 30-story residential building in the west Soho neighborhood of Manhattan, broke ground December 2015 and completed 2019. The building is Piano's first ever residential structure in New York
 Krause Group (parent company of Kum & Go) Corporate Headquarters, Des Moines, Iowa
 Fubon Xinyi A25 in Taipei, Taiwan. Under construction and scheduled to open in 2022
 Ontario Court of Justice, Toronto. Under construction and scheduled to open in early 2022
 Float Office Building, Düsseldorf, Germany, to be completed in 2018
 It has been announced that the Piano firm would partner with a Baltimore firm to design the Stavros Niarchos Foundation Agora Institute on the campus of The Johns Hopkins University
 In April 2019 it was announced that CERN will be partnering with the Renzo Piano Building Workshop for its new Science Gateway outreach center.
 Cultural Center in former power plant GES-2 from 1907 in Moscow, financed by Leonid Mikhelson, boss of power company Novatek, opening is planned for September 2020.

Honors and awards
In 1998, Piano won the Pritzker Prize, often considered the Nobel Prize of architecture. The jury citation compared Piano to Michelangelo and da Vinci and credited him with "redefining modern and postmodern architecture."

In 2006, Piano was selected by TIME as one of the 100 most influential people in the world. He was chosen as the tenth most influential person in the "Arts and Entertainment" category.

On 18 March 2008, he became an honorary citizen of Sarajevo, Bosnia and Herzegovina.

In August 2013, he was appointed Senator for Life in the Senate by Italian president Giorgio Napolitano.

Awards
 1989, Royal Gold Medal
 1990, Knight Grand Cross of the Order of Merit of the Italian Republic
 1990, Kyoto Prize
 1994, Gold Medal of Merit for Culture and Art
 1995, Erasmus Prize
 1995, Praemium Imperiale
 1998, Pritzker Architecture Prize
 2000, Spirit of Wood Architecture Award, Helsinki, Finland
 2002, International Union of Architects#UIA Gold Medal
 2004, Honorary doctorate from Columbia University, New York
 2006, Gold Medal for Italian Architecture, Milano
 2008, AIA Gold Medal
 2008, Sonning Prize
 2013, elected into the National Academy of Design, New York City
 2017, Knight Grand Cross of the Civil Order of Alfonso X, the Wise

Professional and personal life
Piano founded the Renzo Piano Building Workshop (RPBW) in 1981. In 2017 it had 150 collaborators in offices in Paris, Genoa, and New York.

In 2004, he became head of the Renzo Piano Foundation, dedicated to the promotion of the architectural profession. Since June 2008, the headquarters has been co-located with his architectural office at Punta Nave, near Genoa.

After his nomination as Senator for Life in 2013, an honour limited to five office holders in the sole gift of the Italian President, Renzo Piano set up a team of young architects called G124 whose mission is to work on the transformation of Italy's major cities’ suburbs. Team members are paid with Renzo Piano senator's salary and change every year through a public selection. Projects have been developed in Turin, Milan, Padua, Venice and Rome.

Piano resides in Paris with his second wife Milly and four children, Carlo, Matteo, Lia – from his first wife – and Giorgio.

List of works

References

Bibliography

External links

 Pritzker Architecture Prize biography
 Profile at GreatBuildings.com
 Renzo Piano Architecture on Google maps

1937 births
Living people
Architects from Genoa
Engineers from Genoa
Italian life senators
Modernist architects
Pritzker Architecture Prize winners
Recipients of the Civil Order of Alfonso X, the Wise
Kyoto laureates in Arts and Philosophy
Members of the European Academy of Sciences and Arts
Members of the Academy of Arts, Berlin
Polytechnic University of Milan alumni
Academic staff of the Polytechnic University of Milan
People associated with the Los Angeles County Museum of Art
Recipients of the Royal Gold Medal
Recipients of the Praemium Imperiale
20th-century Italian architects
21st-century Italian architects
Honorary Members of the Royal Academy
Members of the Académie d'architecture
People associated with the Whitney Museum of American Art
Recipients of the AIA Gold Medal
Honorary Fellows of the American Institute of Architects
Members of the Royal Swedish Academy of Arts
Compasso d'Oro Award recipients